Lomba Grande is a rural district in the city of Novo Hamburgo in Rio Grande do Sul state in Brazil. 

Its population is 4.204 (2002).  it is located 12 km from the urban center and occupies an area of 143.67 km, which represents 60% of the total area of the municipality. The district is divided into 10 villages: Sao jaco, Morro dos Bois, Taimbe, Santa maria do Butia, Sao Joao do Deserto, Wallahay, Integracao, Passo do Peao, Passo dos Corvos e Travessao.

History 
In 1945, Lomba Grande was moved from district of Sao Leopoldo  to the municipality of Novo Hamburgo.

Hydrograph 
Lomba Grande is part of the River Sinos basin. The district is formed by Peao creek, Quilombo creek, Passo dos Corvos creek, Lomba Grande creek, Taimbe creek, Guari creek, Sao Jaco creek and Butia creek.

References

Novo Hamburgo